Niviaq Korneliussen (born 27 January 1990) is a Greenlandic author writing in Greenlandic and Danish. Her 2014 debut novel, HOMO sapienne was written and published in Greenlandic, as well as in a Danish translation by the author.

Biography 
Korneliussen was born in Nanortalik, Greenland. She studied social sciences at the University of Greenland and then psychology at the University of Aarhus, but ended up dropping out of both programs as her writing career launched.

In 2012 she took part in the Allatta! writing project, which encourages young Greenlanders to write literature that reflects their lives. Korneliussen's short story, “San Francisco," was one of the 10 Allatta! works published in Greenlandic and Danish in the project's 2013 anthology.

Her 2014 debut novel Homo Sapienne focuses on the lives of five young adults in Nuuk. It was noted for both its use of modern storytelling techniques and for its portrayal of LGBTQ+ people in Greenlandic society. As a lesbian, Korneliussen said it was important for her to write about gay life in Greenland because she had never encountered anything about homosexuality in Greenlandic literature.

HOMO sapienne was nominated for the Nordic Council Literature Prize and the Politiken Literature Award in 2015 and has subsequently been published in English, French, German, Swedish, Norwegian and Romanian.

She also published the book Flower Valley (Danish: Blomsterdalen). In 2021, Korneliussen won the Nordic Council Literature Prize for it. In 2022, Peter Olsen presented Korneliussen a cultural award for her writing.

Works
 "San Francisco"
 published in Inuusuttut — nunatsinni nunarsiarmilu (2013). 
 published in Ung i Grønland — ung i verden (2015). 
 HOMO sapienne (2014). 
 translated into Danish by the author as HOMO sapienne (2014). 
 translated into German by Giannina Spinty-Mossin and Katja Langmaier as Nuuk #ohne Filter (2016) 
 translated into French by Inès Jorgensen as Homo sapienne (2018). 
 translated into Swedish by Jonas Rasmussen as Homo Sapienne (2018). 
 translated into Icelandic by Heiðrún Ólafsdóttir as HOMO sapína (2018). 
 translated into English (Great Britain) by Anna Halager as Crimson (2018). 
 translated into English (USA) by Anna Halager as Last night in Nuuk (2019). 
 translated into Norwegian by Kim Leine as HOMO sapienne (2019). 
 translated into Romanian by Simina Răchițeanu as HOMO sapienne (2020). 
 translated into Polish by Agata Lubowicka as HOMO sapienne (2021).

References

1990 births
Living people
Greenlandic women writers
Lesbian novelists
Danish lesbian writers
Danish LGBT novelists